Tyne was built in Sunderland and launched in 1841. She made two complete voyages to New Zealand, carrying immigrants on behalf of the New Zealand Company. She was wrecked in July 1845 on her third such voyage.

Career
Tyne first appeared in Lloyd's Register (LR), in 1841. Her homeport was Newcastle 

She immediately started carrying migrants to New Zealand for the New Zealand Company.

Tyne, under the command of Captain Charles Robertson, arrived on 9 August 1841 at Wellington having sailed from the Downs on 6 April 1841. She sailed for the Thames on 6 September. She then sailed on to Auckland where she remained until the end of November before returning to Wellington. She sailed for Sydney on 12 February 1842, and arrived there on 24 February.

On 12 February 1843 Tyne sailed again from London for Nelson, Wellington, and Auckland. She called at the Cape of Good Hope on 12 May, and Hobart on 31 July. At Hobart the Second Officer, James Stewart, fell overboard into the Derwent River and drowned. Tyne reached Port Nicholson on 11 August. She arrived at Nelson on 28 September. Tyne returned to Port Nicholson on 5 November via Kapiti. On 25 November Tyne sailed for Port Phillip.

In 1844 Tyne was back in Port Nicholson. She sailed for London on 23 May for London.

Fate
In early 1845 she sailed for Port Nicholson from London, reaching Stephen Island on 3 July. She proceeded into Cook Strait near Cape Terawhiti where she encountered a southerly storm. At about 5pm on 4 July she was driven into rocks losing the main and foremasts. She was then driven ashore. On 6 July soldiers from the 96th Regiment of Foot and the local militia arrived to assist the survivors ashore. There were no deaths.

Citations

1841 ships
Age of Sail merchant ships of England
Migrant ships to New Zealand
Maritime incidents in July 1845